Popielarnia may refer to the following places:
Popielarnia, Łódź Voivodeship (central Poland)
Popielarnia, Lublin Voivodeship (east Poland)
Popielarnia, Ostrów Mazowiecka County in Masovian Voivodeship (east-central Poland)
Popielarnia, Żyrardów County in Masovian Voivodeship (east-central Poland)